Sanicula azorica, the Azores sanicle, (Portuguese: erva-do-capitão) is a perennial plant in the family Apiaceae. It is endemic to the Azores, Portugal.

Description
Sanicula azorica is a perennial plant with strongly cut leaves. It has small bouquets with densely clustered white flowers (usually more than three).

Distribution and habitat
Sanicula azorica is present in six of the nine Azorean islands, specifically in Santa Maria, São Miguel, Terceira, São Jorge, Pico and Faial. It inhabits ravines and natural forests associated with laurisilva, in shady and humid places, usually above  in altitude.

References

azorica
Endemic flora of the Azores